The Swedish Maritime Administration is the government agency in Sweden which provides services to the transport sector by keeping the sea lanes open and safe. The agency is to a certain degree financed through fees levied on commercial shipping.

The main services of the Maritime Administration include: pilotage, maintenance of marine fairways, ice-breaking, hydrographics, maritime search and rescue, seamen's service. It also maintains the lighthouses and other aids to navigation of Sweden. Until 1 January 2009, it also was responsible for  maritime safety inspection. Seagoing vessels navigating the Baltic Sea must meet certain ice class requirement. While its mainly deals with merchant shipping, other maritime activities are also taken into account.

Sjöfartsverket runs the Joint Rescue Center Gothenburg.

See also
 List of lighthouses and lightvessels in Sweden
 Sea traffic management
 Swedish Coast Guard

References

External links
 

Government agencies of Sweden
Transport organizations based in Sweden
Lighthouse organizations
National hydrographic offices
Maritime organizations